Oleg Fyodorovich Skorkin (born 29 March 1961) is a former Russian football player.

Career
Skorkin began playing professional football with local side FC SKA Khabarovsk at age 18. Skorkin played for SKA Khabarovsk in the Soviet First League and Soviet Second League scoring more than 50 league goals. In 1993, he had a brief spell at FC Luch Vladivostok in the Russian Top League.

References

1961 births
Living people
Soviet footballers
FC SKA-Khabarovsk players
Russian footballers
FC Luch Vladivostok players
Russian Premier League players
Association football midfielders
Association football forwards